Milan Vojvodić (born 20 January 1994) is a Serbian footballer who plays for FK Polet Nakovo.

External links
 UEFA profile
 Utakmica profile
 
 Srbijafudbal profile

1994 births
Living people
Sportspeople from Kikinda
Serbian footballers
Serbia youth international footballers
Association football midfielders
FK Spartak Subotica players
FK Bačka 1901 players
Serbian SuperLiga players
Serbian expatriate footballers
Serbian expatriate sportspeople in Austria
Expatriate footballers in Austria